Theodore Patrick Williams (June 3, 1916 – October 30, 1993) was an American football back in the National Football League (NFL). He played for the Philadelphia Eagles (1942) and the Boston Yanks (1944).

References

External links

Pro Football Reference
 

1916 births
1993 deaths
American football defensive backs
American football halfbacks
Canadian players of American football
Boston College Eagles football players
Boston Yanks players
Notre Dame Fighting Irish football players
Philadelphia Eagles players
People from Newfoundland (island)
Dominion of Newfoundland people
Gridiron football people from Newfoundland and Labrador